Battus IV of Cyrene surnamed The Handsome or The Fair (ruled 515 BC - 465 BC) was the seventh and second to last Greek king of Cyrenaica of the Battiad dynasty. He was the first Cyrenaean king to rule as a client king under the Persian Empire.

Ancestry
Battus was the son and only child of the fifth Cyrenaean king, Arcesilaus III.  His mother was the daughter of Alazir, a Libyan who served as governor of Barca. Herodotus states that his father and his maternal grandfather were related and his maternal grandmother is unknown.

Reign
Battus succeeded his paternal grandmother Pheretima in late 515 BC. She had died from a skin disease in Egypt. From 515 BC until 465 BC, Battus ruled as king of Cyrenaica. Very little is known about his reign although it seems that his reign was peaceful. During his reign, Cyrenaica exported wheat, barley, olive oil and silphium (a now extinct plant that had aromatic & medicinal properties). He was succeeded by his son Arcesilaus IV and was buried near his paternal ancestors.

See also
 List of Kings of Cyrene
 Silphium

Sources
Herodotus, The Histories, Book 4
Smith, W, Dictionary of Greek and Roman Biography and Mythology, Volume 1
https://www.livius.org/ct-cz/cyrenaica/cyrenaica.html
http://www.mediterranees.net/dictionnaires/smith/cyrene.html

6th-century BC Greek people
5th-century BC Greek people
Kings of Cyrene
465 BC deaths
Year of birth unknown
6th-century BC rulers
5th-century BC rulers
Rulers in the Achaemenid Empire